Kąty  is a village in the administrative district of Gmina Jasionówka, within Mońki County, Podlaskie Voivodeship, in north-eastern Poland.

According to the 1921 census, the village was inhabited by 208 people, among whom 11 were Roman Catholic, 196 Orthodox, and 1 Mosaic. At the same time, 129 inhabitants declared Polish nationality, 79 Belarusian. There were 32 residential buildings in the village.

References

Villages in Mońki County